The Vijay for Best Film is given by STAR Vijay as part of its annual Vijay Awards ceremony for Tamil  (Kollywood) films.

The list
Here is a list of the award winners and the films for which they won.

Nominations
2007 Paruthi Veeran - Gnanavel Raja
 Chennai 600028 - Charan Sripathi
 Mozhi - Prakash Raj
 Pallikoodam - Viswas Sundar
 Polladhavan - Kathiresan
2008 Subramaniyapuram - M. Sasikumar
 Abhiyum Naanum - Prakash Raj
 Anjathey - Nemichand & Hitesh Jhabak
 Vaaranam Aayiram - Venu Ravichandran
2009 Naadodigal - Michael Rayappan|Global Infotainment
Kanchivaram - Four Frames
Naan Kadavul - Vasan Visual Ventures
Pasanga - M. Sasikumar
Vennila Kabadi Kuzhu - Imagine Creations
2010 Angadi Theru - Ayngaran International
Mynaa - Shalom Studios
Thenmerku Paruvakaatru - Jotham Media Works
Nandalala - Ayngaran International
Madrasapattinam - AGS Entertainment
2011 Engaeyum Eppothum - A.R.Murugadoss Productions and Fox Star Studio
Aadukalam - Kathiresan
Aaranya Kaandam - Capital Film Works
Azhagarsamiyin Kuthirai - Escape Artists Motion Pictures
Vaagai Sooda Vaa - Village Theatres
2012 Vazhakku Enn 18/9 - Thirrupathi Brothers
 2013 Thanga Meenkal - Gautham Vasudev Menon
Haridas - Dr V Ram Productions
Paradesi - Bala
Soodhu Kavvum - C. V. Kumar
Thalaimuraigal - M. Sasikumar
 2014 Velaiyilla Pattathari - Dhanush
Goli Soda - Thirrupathi Brothers
Jigarthanda - Group Company
Kathai Thiraikathai Vasanam Iyakkam - Reves Creations
Madras - Studio Green

See also
 Tamil cinema
 Cinema of India

References

Film
Awards for best film